Post Mortem is a murder mystery adventure game by Microïds, released in 2002. Its sequels are Still Life and Still Life 2. The game was also released in French, Italian, German and Spanish.

Gameplay

Post Mortem uses a first-person player view and a point and click user interface, using only the mouse for control. This slightly differs in its sequel, Still Life, however as it is a third person game.

Different cursors appear over portions of the screen to show the player what will happen when it is clicked on.

Gus' notebook is used to collate both the menu system of the game and the place to view documents obtained within the game.

Development history
Microïds developed and completed Post Mortem in ten months using Virtools Dev. An in-house team of 27 people created the game. This included 8 graphic artists, 5 animators and 6 programmers. To ensure the game had variety and no linear storyline, Microïds used a software called "Natural Dialog Engine". Post Mortem was later followed by a spin-off series, Still Life, which has currently produced two games. On September 19, 2008 a new Still Life series website was opened, covering the three games.

Reception

The game received "average" reviews according to the review aggregation website Metacritic. The Cincinnati Enquirer gave it a favorable review about a month before the game was released Stateside.

According to Microïds, the game and its successor, Still Life, were commercial successes. The publisher reported combined global sales for the series above 500,000 units by September 2008.

References

External links

Post Mortem at Microïds

2002 video games
Adventure games
Detective video games
First-person adventure games
Microïds games
Still Life (video game series)
Video games developed in France
Video games set in Paris
Video games set in the 1920s
Windows games
Windows-only games
The Adventure Company games
Single-player video games